"Inseparable" is a 1975 R&B/Soul song originally recorded by American singer Natalie Cole. Released in November 1975, it was her second straight number one single on the Hot Soul Singles chart, from her debut album, Inseparable, and also reached number thirty-two on the Billboard Hot 100 Singles chart.

Chart history

References

External links
[ Song review] on AllMusic

1970s ballads
1975 singles
1975 songs
1976 singles
Capitol Records singles
Natalie Cole songs
Rhythm and blues ballads
Songs written by Marvin Yancy
Soul ballads